Homes.com, Inc. was the fifth-largest real estate portal by traffic market share in the USA in 2018. Headquartered at 150 Granby Street, Norfolk, Virginia, United States, Homes.com maintains additional offices in Boca Raton, Florida;  Tallahassee, Florida and San Diego, California. The company also provides real estate marketing and media services including brand advertising, property listing syndication, reputation management and lead generation.

History
Homes.com began as the primary website for Homes and Land Publishing in 1993 and was incorporated in January 1999 as Homes.com, Inc. In March of the following year, a venture capital funding round generated 38.5 million dollars  and gave Hummer Winblad Venture Partners a controlling interest in Homes.com. In October 2004,  Homes.com, Inc. was purchased by Trader Publishing Company, a joint business venture of Landmark Media Enterprises and Cox Enterprises. In September 2006, Landmark Media Enterprises and Cox Enterprises split the assets of Trader Publishing and Homes.com, Inc. became a subsidiary of Dominion Enterprises, LLC.

In May 2011, Homes.com launched the Home Values channel to display automated estimates of home prices. In August 2011, the company launched Homes Connect, a platform for real estate professionals.

In September 2014, David Mele was appointed president of Homes.com.

In January 2015, Andy Woolley became the head of industry development.

In April 2021, Landmark announced that Homes.com, a unit of its Dominion Enterprises subsidiary, had been sold to CoStar Group Inc. for $156 million.

Products
 Homes.com real estate search enables perusal of a property's features, price, type and location.
 Data Services by Homes.com manages more than 650 MLS IDX (Internet Data Exchange) listing feeds representing over 4.3 million listings. The company provides IDX data aggregation and search technology to other real estate companies such as RE/MAX and ERA.
 Agent and Broker Websites can be purchased from Homes.com with IDX and VOW (Virtual Office Website) capabilities.
 Lead Generation and Management services aggregate leads from various sources and provide CRM tools for managing those leads.

References

External links

 

Real estate companies established in 1999
Companies based in Norfolk, Virginia
American real estate websites
Online real estate databases
Privately held companies based in Virginia
Internet properties established in 1999
1999 establishments in Florida